Doug Bragg (April 13, 1928 – March 13, 1973), born Douglas Clifton Bragg in Gilmer, Texas, was an American country musician and part of the Big D Jamboree. Throughout his music career, he continued his daytime profession as a butcher. He wrote many original songs, including "You’ll Have to Give (Just a Little)", "Whirlwind", "Calling Me Back", "One More Mistake", and "Remember".  In the late 1950s, he formed a six-piece band called The Drifters, which included Earl Martin and Frank White. He made frequent appearances on the Louisiana Hayride.

Family 
He was married twice and had five sons from his first wife, Pinkie, and one from his second wife, Monte Oleta Petty. He also raised her son, Eddie. He died of a heart attack on March 13, 1973, at the age of 44. His son, Monte Clifton Bragg, is also a musician.

Discography

References 

American country singers
Country musicians from Texas
Songwriters from Texas
1928 births
1973 deaths
20th-century American male singers
20th-century American singers
American male songwriters
People from Gilmer, Texas